Hydrophis brookii is a species of venomous sea snake in the subfamily Hydrophiinae of the family Elapidae. The species is native to bodies of water in Southeast Asia.

Etymology
The specific name, brookii, is in honor of British adventurer James Brooke, who became the first White Rajah of Sarawak.

Geographic range
H. brookii is found in the Indian Ocean (Malaysia, Vietnam, western Indonesia: Sumatra, Java, Kalimantan) and the Gulf of Thailand. It is also found in a freshwater lake in Thailand.

Description

Diet
H. brookii predominately preys upon eels.

Reproduction
H. brookii is viviparous.

References

Further reading
Boulenger GA (1896). Catalogue of the Snakes in the British Museum (Natural History). Volume III., Containing the Colubridæ (Opisthoglyphæ and Proteroglyphæ) ... London: Trustees of the British Museum (Natural History). (Taylor and Francis, printers). xiv + 727 pp. + Plates I-XXV. (Hydrophis brookii, pp. 282–283).
Günther A (1872). "On the Reptiles and Amphibians of Borneo". Proceedings of the Zoological Society of London 1872: 586-600 + Plates XXXV-XL. (Hydrophis brookii, new species, p. 597, Figure 5).
Kharin VE (1983). "[A new species of the genus Hydrophis sensu lato (Serpentes, Hydrophiidae) from the North Australian Shelf ]". Zoologicheskii Zhurnal 62 (11): 1751–1753. (in Russian).
Kharin VE (2004). "[A review of sea snakes of the genus Hydrophis sensu stricto (Serpentes, Hydrophiidae)]". Biologiya Morya (Vladivostok) 30 (6): 447–454. (in Russian).

brooki
Reptiles described in 1872
Taxa named by Albert Günther